Copelatus sharpi is a species of diving beetle. It is part of the subfamily Copelatinae in the family Dytiscidae. It was described by Branden in 1885.

References

sharpi
Beetles described in 1885